On January 17, 2012, a proposal was brought to the Occupy Cal General Assembly to occupy UC Berkeley's George and Mary Foster Anthropology Library due to a recent decision by administration to reduce the library's hours and services. Part of the overall trend of privatization and divestment in public resources, the university has reduced spending on its libraries by 12 percent since 2012. With mass approval by the General Assembly, members of Occupy Cal decided to lead a study-in of the anthropology library on January 19 to demand the reinstatement of the library's hours and resources.

On January 19, 2012, following a noon-time rally by the larger Occupy Cal community, a group of roughly 100 students, faculty, and staff occupied the anthropology library and sent their demands to the administration. The non-violent study-in lasted 3 days and 2 nights, and involved several email exchanges between administration, and students and faculty.

On January 21, 2012, the occupiers were notified by the administration that their demands would be met: library hours would be reinstated, and a replacement job would be created to achieve regular access to the library.

References

2012 in California
2012 protests
January 2012 events in the United States
Libraries in California
Occupy movement in California
Riots and protests at UC Berkeley
Protests in the San Francisco Bay Area
University and college academic libraries in the United States